The FEI  European Show Jumping Championships is the European Championship for the equestrian discipline of show jumping. First held in 1957 in Rotterdam, and on an annual basis, it is held every two years, on the years between Olympic Games and World Equestrian Games.

Gold, Silver, and Bronze medals are awarded in both the individual and, since 1975, team competition. There are also championships held for young riders, juniors, ponies, children and  veterans. The most recent edition in 2013 was held as part of a combined FEI European Championship, with dressage and para-dressage.

Both David Broome and Paul Schockemöhle have won the individual title three times. The Federal Republic of Germany have won the team title seven times, with Great Britain next on four team wins.

Past winners 
A European championship for individual show jumping was inaugurated in 1957, featuring only eight riders. Hans Winkler won the first title for West Germany, and West Germany and its successor state Germany have dominated the competition ever since with 14 championship victories.

David Broome of Great Britain was the first rider to win the title twice, and then three times which remains a record. That record was equalled by Paul Schockemöhle who uniquely won three consecutive titles. These two apart, only German Ludger Beerbaum has won the title more than once, with two wins. The competition has been won by 26 different riders. Jos Lansink from the Netherlands, and Michael Whitaker and Harvey Smith have medalled on three occasions without ever winning the competition.

The title has been won, once, by a non-European; in 1966 Nelson Pessoa became the first, and only, South American winner.

Heidi Robbiani was the first female rider to medal in the event, in 1985. Alexandra Ledermann was the first woman to win the title in 1999, a feat equalled by Meredith Michaels-Beerbaum in 2007.

Individual results

Team results

1975 München (FRG) – 6 Teams
1. FRG  – (Alwin Schockemöhle, Hartwig Steenken, Sönke Sönksen, Hendrik Snoek) – 35.5 penalties
2. SUI  – (Weier, Gabathuler, Candrian, Friedli) – 94.0
3. FRA  – (Rozier, Balanda, Roche, Parot) – 97.0

1977 Vienna (AUT) – 9 Teams
1. NED  – (Wouters, Ebben, Nooren, Heins) – 20.0 penalties
2. GBR  – (Ricketts, Johnsey, H. Smith, Broome) – 20.25
3. FRG  – (Koof, Merkel, P. Schockemöhle, Wiltfang) – 36.0

1979 Rotterdam (NED) – 10 Teams
1. GBR  – (Pyrah, Ricketts, Bradley, Broome) – 24.70 penalties
2. FRG  – (Johannsmann, Luther, P. Schockemöhle, Wiltfang) – 30.95
3. IRL  – (Roche, Gerry Mullins, Con Power, Macken) – 34.10

1981 München (FRG) – 9 Teams
1. FRG  – (Koof, Luther, Wiltfang, P. Schockemöhle) – 11.86 penalties
2. SUI  – (Melliger, Gabathuler, T. Fuchs, Candrian) – 21.86
3. NED  – (Hendrix, Ehrens, Nooren, Heins) – 26.35

1983 Hickstead (GBR) – 11 Teams
1. SUI  – (Gabathuler, Robbiani, Melliger, T. Fuchs) – 12.19 penalties
2. GBR  – (H. Smith, Broome, J. Whitaker, Pyrah) – 21.89
3. FRG  – (Buchwaldt, Rüping, Wiltfang, P. Schockemöhle) – 24.32

1985 Dinard (FRA) – 8 Teams
1. GBR  – (Skelton, M. Whitaker, Pyrah, J. Whitaker – 21.56 penalties
2. SUI  – (Guerdat, Robbiani, Gabathuler, Melliger) – 42.08
3. FRG  – (Sloothaak, Rüping, Luther, P. Schockemöhle) – 44.75

1987 St. Gallen (SUI) – 8 Teams
1. GBR  – (Skelton, M. Whitaker,  Pyrah, J. Whitaker,) – 10.32 penalties
2. FRA  – (Ph. Rozier, Durand, Cottier, Robert) – 35.43
3. SUI  – (Guerdat, M. Fuchs, Gabathuler, Melliger) – 45.01

1989 Rotterdam (NED) – 8 Teams
1. GBR  – (Skelton, M. Whitaker,  J.Turi, J. Whitaker,) – 20.35 penalties
2. FRA  – (Godignon, Ph. Rozier, Robert, Durand) – 33.41
3. SUI  – (Gabathuler, M. Fuchs, Melliger, T. Fuchs) – 35.85

1991 La Baule (FRA) – 11 Teams
1. NED  – (Raymakers, Tops, Hendrix, Lansink) – 29.87 penalties
2. GBR  – (Skelton, M. Whitaker, Broome, J. Whitaker,) – 34.16
3. SUI  – (Melliger, M. Fuchs, Letter, T. Fuchs) – 37.39

1993 Gijon (ESP) – 9 Teams
1. SUI  – (Melliger, McNaught-Mändli, Lauber, T. Fuchs) – 19.23 penalties
2. GBR  – (Skelton, M. Whitaker, Armstrong, J. Whitaker,) – 21.15
3. FRA  – (Bourdy, Robert, Godignon, Navet) – 29.88

1995 St. Gallen (SUI) – 11 Teams
1. SUI  – (Melliger, McNaught, Lauber, M. Fuchs) – 8 penalties
2. GBR  – (Skelton, M. Whitaker, Bradley, J. Whitaker,) – 12
3. FRA  – (H. Godignon, Bonneau, A. Ledermann, R-Y. Bost) – 16

1997 Mannheim (GER) – 12 Teams
1. GER  – (L. Nieberg, M. Beerbaum, L. Beerbaum, Merschformann) – 15.75 penalties
2. NED  – (E. Hendrix, B. Romp, J. Tops, J. Lansink) – 21.61
3. GBR  – (M. Whitaker, G. Billington, R. Smith, J. Whitaker,) – 34.86

1999 Hickstead (GBR) – 14 Teams
1. GER  – (C-O. Nagel, M. Michaels-Beerbaum, M. Ehning, L. Beerbaum) – 24.13 penalties
2. SUI  – (L. McNaught, M. Fuchs, B. Mändli, W. Melliger) – 25.91
3. NED  – (E. Hendrix, J. Dubbeldam, J. Tops, J. Lansink) – 29.13

2001 Arnhem (NED) – 14 Teams
1. IRL  – (Kevin Babington, Jessica Kürten, Peter Charles, Dermott Lennon) – 34.04 penalties
2. SWE  – (M. Baryard, H. Lundbeck, R-G. Bengtsson, P. Eriksson) – 35.19
3. GER  – (S.Von Rönne, O. Becker, L. Nieberg, L. Beerbaum) – 41.75

2003 Donaueschingen (GER) – 18 Teams
1. GER  – (Marcus Ehning, Christian Ahlmann, Ludger Beerbaum, Otto Becker) – 15.15 penalties
2. FRA  – (Michel Robert, Eric Levallois, Michel Hécart, Reynald Angot) – 25.30
3. SUI  – (Beat Mändli, Steve Guerdat, Markus Fuchs, Willi Melliger) – 28.86

2005 San Patrignano (ITA) – 14 Teams
1. GER  – (Marcus Ehning, Christian Ahlmann, Marco Kutscher, Meredith M. Beerbaum) – 18 penalties
2. SUI  – (Fabio Crotta, Steve Guerdat, Christina Liebherr, Markus Fuchs) – 34.42
3. NED  – (Gerco Schröder, Leon Thijssen, Jeroen Dubbeldam, Yves Houtackers) – 35.76

2007 Mannheim (GER) – 18 Teams
1. NED  – (Vincent Voorn, Jeroen Dubbeldam, Albert Zoer, Gerco Schröder) – 7.37 penalties
2. GER  – (Marcus Ehning, Christian Ahlmann, Meredith Michaels-Beerbaum, Ludger Beerbaum) – 9.18
3. GBR  – (Michael Whitaker,  David McPherson, Ellen Whitaker, John Whitaker) – 15.43

2009 Windsor (GBR) – 17 Teams
1. SUI  – (Pius Schwizer, Daniel Etter, Steve Guerdat, Clarissa Crotta) – 27.66 penalties
2. ITA  – (Juan-Carlos Garcia, Giuseppe d'Onofrio, Natale Chiaudani, Piergiorgio Bucci) – 31.00
3. GER  – (Marcus Ehning, Carsten-Otto Nagel, Thomas Mühlbauer, Meredith Michaels-Beerbaum) – 31.75

2011 Madrid (ESP) – 9 Teams
1. GER  – (Marco Kutscher, Carsten-Otto Nagel, Janne Friederike Meyer, Ludger Beerbaum) – 10.41 penalties
2. FRA  – (Michel Robert, Pénélope Leprevost, Kevin Staut, Olivier Guillon) – 15.95
3. GBR  – (Nick Skelton, Guy Williams, Ben Maher, John Whitaker) – 22.46

2013 Herning (DEN) – 19 Teams
1. GBR  – (Ben Maher, Michael Whitaker, William Funnell, Scott Brash) – 12.18 penalties
2. GER  – (Daniel Deusser, Carsten-Otto Nagel, Christian Ahlmann, Ludger Beerbaum) – 12.77
3. SWE  – (Jens Fredricson, Angelica Augustsson, Henrik von Eckermann, Rolf-Göran Bengtsson) – 13.44

2015 Aachen (GER) – 22 Teams
1. NED  – (Jeroen Dubbeldam, Maikel van der Vleuten, Jur Vrieling, Gerco Schröder) – 8.82 penalties
2. GER  – (Meredith Michaels-Beerbaum, Christian Ahlmann, Ludger Beerbaum), Daniel Deusser – 12.40
3. SUI  – (Romain Duguet,  Martin Fuchs, Janika Sprunger, Paul Estermann) – 18.23

2017 Gothenburg (SWE) - 17 Teams
1. IRE  - (Shane Sweetnam, Bertram Allen, Denis Lynch, Cian O'Connor) - 12.11 penalties
2 SWE  - (Henrik von Eckermann, Malin Baryard-Johnsson, Douglas Lindlöw, Peder Fredricson) - 18.21
3 SUI  - (Nadja Peter Steiner, Romain Duguet, Martin Fuchs, Steve Guerdat) - 20.15

2019 Rotterdam (NED) - 15 Teams
1. BEL  – (Pieter Devos, Jos Verlooy, Jérôme Guery, Gregory Wathelet) – 12.07 penalties
2. GER  - (Simone Blum, Christian Ahlmann, Marcus Ehning, Daniel Deusser) - 16.22
3. GBR  - (Ben Maher, Holly Smith, Amanda Derbyshire, Scott Brash) - 21.41
2021 Riesenbeck (GER) - 15 Teams

 1. SUI  – (Elian Baumann, Bryan Balsiger, Martin Fuchs, Steve Guerdat) – 9.47 penalties
 2. GER  – (André Thieme, Marcus Ehning, Christian Kukuk, David Will) – 12.77 
 3. BEL  – (Pieter Devos, Jos Verlooy, Olivier Philippaerts, Nicola Philippaerts) – 17.34

References

 

Show jumping events